The 1907-1908 season was the first season for Fenerbahçe. The club played some friendly matches against local clubs.

Squad statistics

Friendly Matches

Kick-off listed in local time (EEST)

External links
 Fenerbahçe Sports Club Official Website 
 macanilari.com Fenerbahçe Maçları Arşivi 

Fenerbahçe S.K. (football) seasons
Turkish football clubs 1907–08 season